Thomas F. Gieryn (born 1950) is Rudy Professor of Sociology at Indiana University. He is also the Vice Provost of Faculty and Academic Affairs. In his research, he focuses on philosophy and sociology of science from a cultural, social, historical, and humanistic perspective.  He is known for developing the concept of "boundary-work," that is, instances in which boundaries, demarcations, or other divisions between fields of knowledge are created, advocated, attacked, or reinforced.  He has served on many councils and boards, including the Advisory Board of the exhibition on "Science in American Life" by the Smithsonian's National Museum of American History. He retired in 2015 from his professorship at Indiana University.

Awards
1982, Edwin H. Sutherland Teaching Award, Department of Sociology, Indiana University
1994, President's Award for Distinguished Teaching, Indiana University
1990, Gieryn won the Robert K. Merton Book Award from the Section on Science, Knowledge and Technology of the American Sociological Association.

Bibliography

See also
 Sociology of scientific knowledge
 Conflict thesis
 Demarcation problem
 Science wars

Weblinks 
 Homepage of Gieryn

References

1950 births
Living people
American sociologists
Kalamazoo College alumni
Sociologists of science